The 1989 Women's Junior World Handball Championship was the seventh edition of the tournament which took place in Nigeria from 22 September to 1 October 1989. Fifteen teams competed in the competition from three continents with Algeria, Switzerland and Turkey making their first appearance in a tournament.

In the final, the Soviet Union took home their sixth gold medal and their fourth in a row after defeating South Korea by three goals. Bulgaria claimed their first junior medal after defeating Yugoslavia for third.

First round

Group A

Group B

Group C

Group D

Second round

Group I

Group II

Thirteenth place

Placement matches

Eleventh-place game

Ninth-place game

Seventh-place game

Fifth-place game

Third-place game

Final

Ranking
The final rankings from the 1989 edition:

References

External links 

Women's Junior World Handball
Women's Junior World Handball Championship, 1989
1989
Junior Handball
Junior Handball
Women's handball in Nigeria